The Fiat Albea is a subcompact car produced by the Italian manufacturer Fiat between 2002 and 2012, at the Tofaş facilities in Turkey. It is the European version of the global Fiat Siena, the sedan car derived from the hatch compact Fiat Palio. It is a low cost sedan, aimed at developing global markets, and was not sold in Western Europe.

It was also produced in China, where it retained the Fiat Siena nameplate and had two derived versions, the Fiat Perla and currently the Zotye Z200.

Production

The Albea was designed by the Italian designer Giorgetto Giugiaro. It has a similar design with its South American equivalent, the Siena, but with a longer wheelbase. The extension is visible in a somewhat extended segment between the trailing edge of the rear doors and the rear wheelhouse.

A facelifted version has been available since February 2005, two months before the Palio underwent a similar restyling. This version has a new front end, no bumper moldings, and a round "Fiat" badge in the top center of the trunklid.

From 2006 to 2011, the Albea was assembled from complete knock down kits in Russia, in Naberezhnye Chelny, at the Fiat-Sollers plant. The car was available in Russia with 1.4-liter petrol engine only.

Production in Turkey ended in 2012, ending altogether production of the European version of the Palio.

Engines

Safety rating
The Albea was tested by ARCAP, according to the Euro NCAP latest regulations. It scored 8.5 points in the frontal crash test, equivalent to three stars in the Euro NCAP testings. The tested vehicle was equipped with standard driver airbag and regular seatbelts.

The Fiat Perla, a Chinese version of the Albea, was tested in China by the China-NCAP in three different tests: a 100% front crash test with a wall (similar to the US NTHSA test), a 40% offset test (similar to the Euro NCAP test) and a side crash test similar to the Euro NCAP.

The Perla scored 8.06 points in the 100% frontal crash test, equivalent to three stars, 12.02 points in the 40% offset crash test, equivalent to four stars, and 10,96 points in the side crash test, equivalent to three stars, with an average result of 31 points and three stars. The tested vehicle was equipped with standard driver and passenger airbag and regular seatbelts.

Nameplate use
In Mexico, the 2009 model of the Fiat Siena has been marketed as the Fiat Albea, replacing the Palio Sedán nameplate used on the previous series of the car.

References

External links

Official website (with redirects to each country's website)
Official Russian Fiat Albea website

Albea
Front-wheel-drive vehicles
ARCAP superminis
Sedans
Cars introduced in 2002
2010s cars
Cars of Turkey
Vehicles with CVT transmission